Emma Leth, became Emma Rosenzweig (born 26 July 1990) is a Danish actress and model.

Life

She has appeared in several Danish movies and TV-series since she was a child, such as Supervoksen (aka Triple Dare) (2006), Tempelriddernes Skat III (2008), Rejseholdet (2001) and more recently Sandheden om mænd (2010). Besides Emma's movie- and TV-series career, she also works as a model and has among others worked with Balenciaga for several years. She has also worked with brands such as GANNI, ZARA and Sophie Bille Brahe.

Private life
Leth is married to Danish artist Tal R, whom she met in 2015 and married in 2018. They had a son, Abel, in 2016 and they live in Copenhagen.

Filmography

Cinema 

 Supervoksen (2006)
 skat III Tempelriddernes skat III (2008)
 Sandheden om mænd (2010)

Television 
 Rejseholdet (2001) 
  (2009)

Short film

 14 Fucking 14 (2005)
 Et andet sted (2006)
 (kortfilm) Alliancen (2008)
 Tick Boom Tick Tick Boom (2009)
 historie om en pigetrio En historie om en pigetrio (2009)

References

External links 
 
Emma Leth on www.unique.dk

1990 births
Living people
Danish child actresses
21st-century Danish actresses